Ilmala railway station is a railway station on the VR commuter rail network located in northern Helsinki, Finland. The VR Group maintains a depot north of the station.

The station was opened in 1967 to serve the newly built television studios of the Finnish public broadcaster Yle and commercial broadcaster MTV3.

Ilmala depot
North of the Ilmala station, in Pohjois-Pasila between the two branches of the railway which go respectively to Huopalahti and Tikkurila, a large space is used for the VR train and bus depot (Ilmalan varikko) and for a Posti sorting centre (Postinkeskus or Posti lajittelukeskus) and related offices.

Near the tracks, VR has built a 100,000 m³ depot to accumulate excess snow which cannot be eliminated by the snow-melting field in Pasila. The depot can also melt snow with heat from the return water of the buildings' heating which uses district heating provided by Helen.

Helsinki operating point
Ilmala is one part of the split railway operating point of Helsinki, the other parts of which include the passenger stations of Helsinki, Pasila, Käpylä and Oulunkylä, the Pasila freight and car loading stations, the Ilmala depot and the Helsinki Kivihaka crossover.

Nearby landmarks
 Pöllölaakso (headquarters of MTV3 until late-2022)
 Yle Mediatalo (fi: Mediatalo) and Studiotalo (fi: Studiotalo)

References

External links 

Railway stations in Helsinki
Pasila